Hirapur is a census town in Balaghat district in the Indian state of Madhya Pradesh.

Geography
It has an average elevation of 501 metres (1643 feet).

Demographics
 India census, Hirapur had a population of 5,639. Males constitute 50% of the population and females 50%. Hirapur has an average literacy rate of 65%, higher than the national average of 59.5%: male literacy is 73%, and female literacy is 57%. In Hirapur, 15% of the population is under 6 years of age.

References

Cities and towns in Balaghat district